North Pole Stream is a tributary to the Little Southwest Miramichi River, with its headwaters in the Christmas Mountains of north-central, New Brunswick, Canada. It is an important spawning stream for Atlantic Salmon, and renowned among fly fishers.

The Mi'kmaq referred to the stream as "Kadunnatquegak" (watching salmon in a pool).

The English name seems to have originated with lumbermen, about 1840. Two theories have been suggested for its origin:

the most northerly point they had lumbered
very cold conditions

The name inspired A. F. Wightman to name the adjacent peaks after Santa Claus' reindeer. These peaks are now referred to as the Christmas Mountains.

See also
List of rivers of New Brunswick

References

Rivers of New Brunswick
Landforms of Northumberland County, New Brunswick